Pathway to Glory is a tactical turn-based game for the Nokia N-Gage, by Nokia and Ubisoft RedLynx, released in late 2004.

Story
In the summer of 1943, special forces are urgently needed in the struggle for Europe. The player commands a multinational unit of highly trained men and accomplishes action-packed, historical missions by defending, ambushing, destroying and attacking.

Pathway to Glory can be played in single-player and multiplayer mode, using either hotseat, N-Gage Arena or a local Bluetooth connection.

Reception

The game received 83/100 reviews according to the review aggregation website Metacritic. Gamespot nominated Pathway to Glory as the Best of E3 2004, the best N-Gage Game: "Pathway to Glory is our N-Gage Best of E3 pick because it offers a cohesive, refined, and original take on the strategy genre. The fact that Nokia appears to be pulling it off on a developing, port-laden platform makes the achievement all the more impressive." https://www.gamespot.com/articles/best-of-e3-2004/1100-6098994/

Sequel
A sequel for Pathway to Glory was announced during E3 2005, titled Pathway to Glory: Ikusa Islands. It was released in 2005.

References

External links 

N-Gage games
2004 video games
Turn-based tactics video games
Video games developed in Finland
World War II video games
RedLynx games
Nokia games
Multiplayer and single-player video games